Trogium pulsatorium, known generally as larger pale booklouse, is a species of granary booklouse in the family Trogiidae. Other common names include the deathwatch, common booklouse, and grain psocid. It is found in Africa, Australia, Europe and Northern Asia (excluding China), Central America, North America, Southern Asia, New Zealand, and Antarctica.

References

External links

 

Trogiidae
Articles created by Qbugbot
Insects described in 1758
Taxa named by Carl Linnaeus